Rafael Vásquez Santiago is a former Major League Baseball pitcher who appeared in 9 games with the Seattle Mariners in . He had been traded along with Mario Mendoza and Odell Jones from the Pittsburgh Pirates to the Mariners for Enrique Romo, Tom McMillan and Rick Jones at the Winter Meetings on December 5, 1978.

References

External links

1958 births
Buffalo Bisons (minor league) players
Charleston Patriots players
Columbus Clippers players
Dominican Republic expatriate baseball players in the United States
Gulf Coast Pirates players

Living people
Major League Baseball pitchers
Major League Baseball players from the Dominican Republic
Salem Pirates players
Seattle Mariners players
Shreveport Captains players
Spokane Indians players
Tacoma Tigers players
People from La Romana, Dominican Republic